Panaiyapuram  is a village in the Srirangam taluk of Tiruchirappalli district in Tamil Nadu, India.

Demographics 

As per the 2001 census, Panaiyapuram had a population of 1,235 with 614 males and 621 females. The sex ratio was 1011 and the literacy rate, 70.93.

References 

 

Villages in Tiruchirappalli district